Ali Yasser Al-Rthoom (born August 24, 1993) is a Jordanian football player who plays as a defender for Al-Ahli.

References 

Association football defenders
Al-Ahli SC (Amman) players
1993 births
Jordanian footballers
Living people
Footballers at the 2014 Asian Games
Asian Games competitors for Jordan